Thomas Grace may refer to:

 Thomas Grace (Archdeacon of Ardfert) (1770–1848), Irish priest
 Thomas Grace (Archdeacon of Marlborough) (fl. 1873–1890), Anglican priest in New Zealand, son of the above
 Thomas Grace (bishop of Sacramento) (1846–1921), Irish-born Roman Catholic bishop
 Thomas Grace (bishop of Saint Paul) (1814–1897), Roman Catholic bishop in the USA
 Thomas Grace (cricketer) (1890–1915), New Zealand cricketer
 Thomas Grace (missionary) (1815–1879), English-born Anglican missionary to New Zealand
 Tom Grace (born 1948), Irish rugby union player
 Thomas Grace (Alias), a character on the spy-fi drama series Alias

See also 
 Thomas de Grace (1584–1636), Roman Catholic prelate